John O'Donovan (25 July 1806 – 10 December 1861), from Atateemore, in the parish of Kilcolumb, County Kilkenny, and educated at Hunt's Academy, Waterford, was an Irish language scholar from Ireland.

Life
He was the fourth son of Edmond O'Donovan and Eleanor Hoberlin of Rochestown. His early career may have been inspired by his uncle Parick O'Donovan. He worked for antiquarian James Hardiman researching state papers and traditional sources at the Public Records Office. Hardiman had secured O'Donovan a place in Maynooth College which he turned down. He also taught Irish to Thomas Larcom for a short period in 1828 and worked for Myles John O'Reilly, a collector of Irish manuscripts.

Following the death of Edward O'Reilly in August 1830, he was recruited to the Topographical Department of the first Ordnance Survey of Ireland under George Petrie in October 1830. Apart from a brief period in 1833, he worked steadily for the Survey on place-name researches until 1842, unearthing and preserving many manuscripts. After that date, O'Donovan's work with the Survey tailed off, although he was called upon from time to time to undertake place-name research on a day-to-day basis. He researched maps and manuscripts at many libraries and archives in Ireland and England, with a view to establishing the correct origin of as many of Ireland's 63,000 townland names as possible. His letters to Larcom are regarded as an important record of the ancient lore of Ireland for those counties he documented during his years of travel throughout much of Ireland.

By 1845, O'Donovan was corresponding with the younger scholar William Reeves, and much of their correspondence to 1860 survives.

O'Donovan became professor of Celtic Languages at Queen's University, Belfast, and was called to the Bar in 1847. His work on linguistics was recognised in 1848 by the Royal Irish Academy, who awarded him their prestigious Cunningham Medal. On the recommendation of Jacob Grimm, he was elected a corresponding member of the Royal Academy of Prussia in 1856.

Never in great health, he died shortly after midnight on 10 December 1861 at his residence, 36 Upper Buckingham Street, Dublin.  He was buried on 13 December 1861 in Glasnevin Cemetery, where his tombstone inscription has slightly wrong dates of both birth and death.

He married Mary Anne Broughton, sister-in-law of Eugene O'Curry and was father of nine children (all but one of whom died without issue). His wife received a small state pension after his death.

Personal genealogy
In a letter to Jeremiah O'Donovan Rossa of 29 May 1856 John O'Donovan gave his lineage as follows:
 From the senior branch of Clann-Cahill, descended from the elder son Donnell II O'Donovan, married Joanna MacCarthy Reagh of Castle Donovan and who died 1638
 Edmond, married Catherine de Burgo, killed 1643.
 Conor, married Rose Kavanagh.
 William, married Mary Oberlin, a Puritan, died 1749.
 Edmond, married to Mary Archdeacon, died 1798.
 Edmond, married Eleanor Oberlin, died 1817.
 John O'Donovan, L.L.D. married to Mary Ann Broughton, a descendant of Cromwellian settlers.
 Edmond 1840 d. 1842, John 1842, Edmond 1844 later War Correspondent (died in Sudan) 1882, William 1846, Richard 1846, Henry dead 1850, Henry 1852, Daniel 1856, Morgan Kavanaugh O'C 1859 d.1860. See Edmund O'Donovan.

Select bibliography 

 

 
 

Laws, charters, and proclamations
 
 

 

 Irish language, grammar, etymologies, and dictionaries

 

Irish histories
 

2nd edition (1856): Vol.1; Vol.2; Vol.3; Vol.4; Vol.5; Vol.6; Vol.7; 

Genealogies, family, tribal, and regional histories
 
No. 41 (10 Apr 1841) pp.326-28; No.42 (17 Apr 1841) pp.330-32; No. 46 (15 May 1841) pp.365-66; No.48 (29 May 1841) pp.381-84; No.50 (12 June 1841) pp.396-98; No.51 (19 June 1841) pp.405-07; No.52 (26 June 1841) pp.413–15. 
Republished as 
 
 
 
 
 
 

On historical letters, journals, and correspondences
 
 
 
 
 

Religious works and figures

See also
 Mícheál Ó Cléirigh
 James Ussher
 Dubhaltach Mac Fhirbhisigh
 Eoin MacNeill

References

Sources

External links 

1806 births
1861 deaths
Academics of Queen's University Belfast
19th-century Irish historians
Linguists from Ireland
Burials at Glasnevin Cemetery
People from County Kilkenny
Irish scribes
John
Toponymists